Cornmarket Street (colloquially referred to as Cornmarket or historically The Corn) is a major shopping street and pedestrian precinct in Oxford, England that runs north to south between Magdalen Street and Carfax Tower.

To the east is the Golden Cross arcade of small jewellery and craft shops in a courtyard, leading to the Covered Market. To the west is the indoor Clarendon Shopping Centre that connects in an L-shape to Queen Street.

Cornmarket was semi-pedestrianised and made a limited-access street in 1999. Cycling is allowed 6pm to 10am. In 2002, it was voted Britain's second worst street in a poll of listeners to the Today programme. The rating was largely due to a failed attempt to repave the street in 2001. The granite setts, which had been laid extensively, cracked and the contractor went into liquidation. In 2003, it was repaved again and new benches installed, amidst reports of budgetary problems.

History of shops

26–28 Cornmarket on the corner of Ship Street is a 14th-century timber-framed building. It is the surviving half of a building completed in about 1386 as the New Inn. It belongs to Jesus College and was investigated and restored in 1983.

Boswells of Oxford established what was the largest department store in Oxford at 50 Cornmarket Street in 1738. In 1928, the shop opened a new main entrance on Broad Street, but it still retained an entrance on Cornmarket Street. The store closed in 2020

The Victorian photographer Henry Taunt set up a shop at 33 Cornmarket Street in 1869. It was a small shop and in 1874 he moved to larger premises in Broad Street.

Zac's was a waterproof clothing manufacturing and retail firm based at 26–27 Cornmarket, established in the 1880s and closed in 1983.

Woolworth's bought the Clarendon Hotel on the west side of the street in 1939 with the intention of demolishing it for the construction of a new store on the site. In earlier centuries, the Clarendon had been the Star Inn. It was a complex of 16th- and 17th-century buildings, one of which had a vaulted Norman cellar dating from the second half of the 12th century: possibly the oldest vaulted structure in Oxford. Thomas Sharp, in Oxford Replanned (1948) a report commissioned by Oxford City Council, warned that Oxford was already short of quality hotel accommodation and the Clarendon's demolition would be a mistake. Notwithstanding Sharp's conclusions, Woolworth's demolished the hotel in 1954–55. After demolition of all the buildings above the surface, parts of the 12th-century vault were destroyed to make way for one of the columns of Clarendon House built in its place.

Clarendon House was designed by William Holford and built in 1956–57. The façade is of coursed and squared rubble masonry with panels of blue-green slate, and Nikolaus Pevsner commended the building as tactful and elegant. The building is now part of the Clarendon Shopping Centre.

St Michael at the North Gate
The tower of the Church of England parish church of St Michael at the North Gate is the oldest building in Oxford. It is Saxon and dates from about 1000–1050. The church is named after the medieval gate of Oxford's city walls that spanned the north end of Cornmarket.

Near this church was the Bocardo Prison, where the Oxford Martyrs were imprisoned in 1555–56 before being burnt at the stake outside the town wall in what is now Broad Street nearby.

Adjoining streets

 Broad Street
 George Street
 High Street
 Magdalen Street
 Market Street
 Queen Street
 St Aldate's
 St Michael's Street
 Ship Street

Gallery

References

Sources and further reading

Streets in Oxford
Shopping streets in Oxford
Pedestrian streets in the United Kingdom